Events from the year 1332 in Ireland.

Incumbent
Lord: Edward III

Events
 "The defeat of Berna-in-mil was inflicted on Tomaltach Mac Diarmata and on Mac William, where were killed many of the people of Mac William by the son of the Earl and Tomaltach Mac Donnchaidh."
 20 January – 2 May Justicier de Lucy campaigns in Munster, where he captures William and Walter de Bermingham in February (see 11 July)
 7 April Roger Mortimer's outlawry of Hugh de Lacy queried
 July Bunratty castle captured by King Muirchertach of Thomond and Mac Con Mara
 4 August Justicer de Lucy ordered to stay execution against magnates imprisoned for felonies; Roger Outlaw commissioned to treat with English and Irish at war with Edward III
 17 August Parliament at Dublin
 9 September – 15 November Justicier de Lucy leads expedition to Thomond
 15 September Edward III's expedition to Ireland abandoned
 20 September Prisage of wine at ports of Dublin, Drogheda, Limerick and Waterford granted to the Earl of Ormond
 30 September John Darcy reappointed justicier (see 13 February 1333
 3 December Thomas de Burgh acting as deputy justicier
 Richard FitzRalph of Dundalk appointed chancellor of University of Oxford; holds post until 1334

Births

Deaths

 Walter de Burgh starved to death while imprisoned by his cousin the Earl of Ulster
 11 July William de Bermingham, hung at Dublin

References

"The Annals of Ireland by Friar John Clyn", edited and translated with an Introduction, by Bernadette Williams, Four Courts Press, 2007. , pp. 240–244.
"A New History of Ireland VIII: A Chronology of Irish History to 1976", edited by T. W. Moody, F.X. Martin and F.J. Byrne. Oxford, 1982. .
http://www.ucc.ie/celt/published/T100001B/index.html
http://www.ucc.ie/celt/published/T100005C/index.html
http://www.ucc.ie/celt/published/T100010B/index.html

 
1330s in Ireland
Ireland
Years of the 14th century in Ireland